Level One is an album by Larry Coryell and The Eleventh House that was released in 1975 by Arista Records. The album reached number 23 on Billboard magazine's jazz album chart and number 163 on the Billboard Top LPs chart. Robert Taylor states in his Allmusic review, "This is a forgotten gem from the fusion era."

Track listing

Side one
 "Level One" (Mike Mandel) – 3:02
 "The Other Side"  (Michael Lawrence) – 4:35
 "Diedra"  (Mandell) – 3:56
 "Some Greasy Stuff"  (Alphonze Mouzon) – 3:30
 "Nyctaphobia"  (Mouzon) – 4:04

Side two
 "Suite"  (Larry Coryell) – 5:32
 A. Entrance
 B. Repose
 C. Exit
<li>"Eyes of Love"  (Coryell) – 2:25
<li>"Struttin' with Sunshine"  (Coryell) – 3:20
<li>"That's the Joint"  (John Lee) – 4:03

Personnel
 Larry Coryell – guitar
 Michael Lawrence – flugelhorn, trumpet
 Mike Mandel – keyboards
 Steve Khan – 12-string guitar on "Level One"
 John Lee – bass guitar
 Alphonse Mouzon – drums, percussion

Chart performance

References

1975 albums
Larry Coryell albums
Arista Records albums